Oligobalistes robustus is an extinct prehistoric triggerfish that lived during the Rupelian of the Middle Oligocene epoch of Central Europe.

See also

 Prehistoric fish
 List of prehistoric bony fish

References

Oligocene fish
Balistidae
Prehistoric life of Europe
Fossil taxa described in 2002
Paleogene fish of Europe